The 1937 Arizona Wildcats football team represented the University of Arizona in the Border Conference during the 1937 college football season.  In their fifth and final season under head coach Tex Oliver, the Wildcats compiled an 8–2 record (3–1 against Border opponents), finished in third place in the conference, and outscored their opponents, 194 to 88.  The team played its home games at Arizona Stadium in Tucson, Arizona, except for one home game against Oklahoma A&M that was played at Phoenix Union High School in Phoenix, Arizona.

Schedule

References

Arizona
Arizona Wildcats football seasons
Arizona Wildcats football